Phytophthora infestans is an oomycete or water mold, a fungus-like microorganism that causes the serious potato and tomato disease known as late blight or potato blight. Early blight, caused by Alternaria solani, is also often called "potato blight". Late blight was a major culprit in the 1840s European, the 1845–1852 Irish, and the 1846 Highland potato famines. The organism can also infect some other members of the Solanaceae.

Etymology
The genus name Phytophthora comes from the Greek –(), meaning : "plant" – plus the Greek , meaning : "decay, ruin, perish".  The species name infestans is the present participle of the Latin verb , meaning : "attacking, destroying", from which we get the word "to infest".  The name Phytophthora infestans was coined in 1876 by the German mycologist Heinrich Anton de Bary (1831–1888).

Life cycle, signs and symptoms

The asexual life cycle of Phytophthora infestans is characterized by alternating phases of hyphal growth, sporulation, sporangia germination (either through zoospore release or direct germination, i.e. germ tube emergence from the sporangium), and the re-establishment of hyphal growth. There is also a sexual cycle, which occurs when isolates of opposite mating type (A1 and A2, see § Mating types below) meet. Hormonal communication triggers the formation of the sexual spores, called oospores. The different types of spores play major roles in the dissemination and survival of P. infestans. Sporangia are spread by wind or water and enable the movement of P. infestans  between different host plants. The zoospores released from sporangia are biflagellated and chemotactic, allowing further movement of P. infestans on water films found on leaves or soils. Both sporangia and zoospores are short-lived, in contrast to oospores which can persist in a viable form for many years.

People can observe Phytophthora infestans produce dark green, then brown then black spots on the surface of potato leaves and stems, often near the tips or edges, where water or dew collects. The sporangia and sporangiophores appear white on the lower surface of the foliage. As for tuber blight, the white mycelium often shows on the tubers' surface.

Under ideal conditions, P. infestans completes its life cycle on potato or tomato foliage in about five days. Sporangia develop on the leaves, spreading through the crop when temperatures are above  and humidity is over 75–80% for 2 days or more. Rain can wash spores into the soil where they infect young tubers, and the spores can also travel long distances on the wind. The early stages of blight are easily missed. Symptoms include the appearance of dark blotches on leaf tips and plant stems. White mold will appear under the leaves in humid conditions and the whole plant may quickly collapse. Infected tubers develop grey or dark patches that are reddish brown beneath the skin, and quickly decay to a foul-smelling mush caused by the infestation of secondary soft bacterial rots. Seemingly healthy tubers may rot later when in store.

P. infestans survives poorly in nature apart from on its plant hosts. Under most conditions, the hyphae and asexual sporangia can survive for only brief periods in plant debris or soil, and are generally killed off during frosts or very warm weather. The exceptions involve oospores, and hyphae present within tubers. The persistence of viable pathogen within tubers, such as those that are left in the ground after the previous year's harvest or left in cull piles is a major problem in disease management. In particular, volunteer plants sprouting from infected tubers are thought to be a major source of inoculum (or propagules) at the start of a growing season. This can have devastating effects by destroying entire crops.

Mating types
The mating types are broadly divided into A1 and A2. Until the 1980s populations could only be distinguished by virulence assays and mating types, but since then more detailed analysis has shown that mating type and genotype are substantially decoupled. These types each produce a mating hormone of their own. Pathogen populations are grouped into clonal lineages of these mating types and includes:

A1
A1 produces a mating hormone, a diterpene α1. Clonal lineages of A1 include:
 CN-1, -2, -4, -5, -6, -7, -8 - mtDNA haplotype Ia, China in 1996-7
  - Ia, China, 1996-7
  - Ia, China, 2004
  - IIb, China, 2000&2
  - IIa, China, 2004-9
  - Ia/IIb, China, 2004-9
  - (only presumed to be A1), mtDNA haplo Ia subtype , Japan, Philippines, India, China, Malaysia, Nepal, present some time before 1950
  - Ia, India, Nepal, 1993
  - Ia, India, 1993
 JP-2/SIB-1/RF006 - mtDNA haplo IIa, distinguishable by RG57, intermediate level of metalaxyl resistance, Japan, China, Korea, Thailand, 1996–present
  - IIa, distinguishable by RG57, intermediate level of metalaxyl resistance, Japan, 1996–present
  - IIa, distinguishable by RG57, intermediate level of metalaxyl resistance, Japan, 1996–present
  sensu Zhang (not to be confused with #KR-1 sensu Gotoh below) - IIa, Korea, 2002-4
 KR_1_A1 - mtDNA haplo unknown, Korea, 2009-16
  - Ia, China, 2004
  - Ia, India, Nepal, 1993, 1996-7
  - Ia, Nepal, 1997
  - Ia, Nepal, 1999-2000
  - (Also A2, see #the A2 type of NP2 below) Ia, Nepal, 1999-2000
  (not to be confused with #US-1 below) - Ib, Nepal, 1999-2000 
  (not to be confused with #NP3/US-1 above) - Ib, China, India, Nepal, Japan, Taiwan, Thailand, Vietnam, 1940-2000
  - Ia, Nepal, 1999-2000
  - mtDNA haplo unknown, Nepal, 1999-2000
  - IIb, Taiwan, Korea, Vietnam, 1998-2016
  - IIb, China, 2002&4
  - IIa, Korea, 2003-4
 
 
  - Ia, Indonesia, 2016-9

A2
Discovered by John Niederhauser in the 1950s, in the Toluca Valley in Central Mexico, while working for the Rockefeller Foundation's Mexican Agriculture Program. Published in Niederhauser 1956. A2 produces a mating hormone α2. Clonal lineages of A2 include:
 CN02 - See #13_A2/CN02 below
  - with mtDNA haplotype H-20
  - IIa, Japan, Korea, Indonesia, late 1980s-present
  sensu Gotoh (not to be confused with #KR-1 sensu Zhang above) - IIa, differs from JP-1 by one RG57 band, Korea, 1992
  - mtDNA haplo unknown, Korea, 2009-16
  - Ia, China, 2001
  - (Also A1, see #the A1 type of NP2 above) Ia, Nepal, 1999-2000
  - Ib, Nepal, 1999-2000
  - Ia, Nepal, 1999-2000
  - Ia, Thailand, China, Nepal, 1994&7
 Unknown - Ib, India, 1996-2003
  - Brazil
 
 
  - IIa, Korea, 2002-3
 /CN02 - Ia, China, India, Bangladesh, Nepal, Pakistan, Myanmar, 2005-19

Self-fertile
A self-fertile type was present in China between 2009 and 2013.

Physiology
Melatonin in P. infestans/host systems reduces the oomycete's tolerance to stress. PiINF1 is the INF1 in P. infestans. Hosts respond with autophagy upon detection of this elicitor, Liu et al. 2005 finding this to be the only alternative to mass hypersensitivity leading to mass programmed cell death.

Genetics
P. infestans is diploid, with about 8-10 chromosomes, and in 2009 scientists completed the sequencing of its genome. The genome was found to be considerably larger (240 Mbp) than that of most other Phytophthora species whose genomes have been sequenced; P. sojae has a 95 Mbp genome and P. ramorum had a 65 Mbp genome.  About 18,000 genes were detected within the P. infestans genome. It also contained a diverse variety of transposons and many gene families encoding for effector proteins that are involved in causing pathogenicity. These proteins are split into two main groups depending on whether they are produced by the water mold in the symplast (inside plant cells) or in the apoplast (between plant cells). Proteins produced in the symplast included RXLR proteins, which contain an arginine-X-leucine-arginine (where X can be any amino acid) sequence at the amino terminus of the protein. Some RXLR proteins are avirulence proteins, meaning that they can be detected by the plant and lead to a hypersensitive response which restricts the growth of the pathogen. P. infestans was found to encode around 60% more of these proteins than most other Phytophthora species. Those found in the apoplast include hydrolytic enzymes such as proteases, lipases and glycosylases that act to degrade plant tissue, enzyme inhibitors to protect against host defence enzymes and necrotizing toxins. Overall the genome was found to have an extremely high repeat content (around 74%) and to have an unusual gene distribution in that some areas contain many genes whereas others contain very few.

The pathogen shows high allelic diversity in many isolates collected in Europe. This may be due to widespread trisomy or polyploidy in those populations.

Research 
Study of P. infestans presents sampling difficulties in the United States. It occurs only sporadically and usually has significant founder effects due to each epidemic starting from introduction of a single genotype.

Origin and diversity of P. infestans

The highlands of central Mexico are considered by many to be the center of origin of P. infestans, although others have proposed its origin to be in the Andes, which is also the origin of potatoes. A recent study evaluated these two alternate hypotheses and found conclusive support for central Mexico being the center of origin. Support for Mexico  specifically the Toluca Valley  comes from multiple observations including the fact that populations are genetically most diverse in Mexico, late blight is observed in native tuber-bearing Solanum species, populations of the pathogen are in Hardy–Weinberg equilibrium, the two mating (see § Mating types above) types occur in a 1:1 ratio, and detailed phylogeographic and evolutionary studies. Furthermore, the closest relatives of P. infestans, namely P. mirabilis and P. ipomoeae are endemic to central Mexico. On the other hand, the only close relative found in South America, namely P. andina, is a hybrid that does not share a single common ancestor with P. infestans. Finally, populations of P. infestans in South America lack genetic diversity and are clonal.

Migrations from Mexico to North America or Europe have occurred several times throughout history, probably linked to the movement of tubers. Until the 1970s, the A2 mating type was restricted to Mexico, but now in many regions of the world both A1 and A2 isolates can be found in the same region. The co-occurrence of the two mating types is significant due to the possibility of sexual recombination and formation of oospores, which can survive the winter. Only in Mexico and Scandinavia, however, is oospore formation thought to play a role in overwintering. In other parts of Europe, increasing genetic diversity has been observed as a consequence of sexual reproduction. This is notable since different forms of P. infestans vary in their aggressiveness on potato or tomato, in sporulation rate, and sensitivity to fungicides. Variation in such traits also occurs in North America, however importation of new genotypes from Mexico appears to be the predominant cause of genetic diversity, as opposed to sexual recombination within potato or tomato fields. In 1976 - due to a summer drought in Europe - there was a potato production shortfall and so eating potatoes were imported to fill the shortfall. It is thought that this was the vehicle for mating type A2 to reach the rest of the world. In any case, there had been little diversity, consisting of the US-1 strain, and of that only one type of: mating type, mtDNA, restriction fragment length polymorphism, and di-locus isozyme. Then in 1980 suddenly greater diversity and A2 appeared in Europe. In 1981 it was found in the Netherlands, United Kingdom, 1985 in Sweden, the early 1990s in Norway and Finland, 1996 in Denmark, and 1999 in Iceland. In the UK new A1 lineages only replaced the old lineage by end of the '80s, and A2 spread even more slowly, with Britain having low levels and Ireland (north and Republic) having none-to-trace detections through the '90s. Many of the strains that appeared outside of Mexico since the 1980s have been more aggressive, leading to increased crop losses. In Europe since 2013 the populations have been tracked by the EuroBlight network (see links below). Some of the differences between strains may be related to variation in the RXLR effectors that are present.

Disease management

P. infestans is still a difficult disease to control. There are many chemical options in agriculture for the control of damage to the foliage as well as the fruit (for tomatoes) and the tuber  (for potatoes). A few of the most common foliar-applied fungicides are Ridomil, a Gavel/SuperTin tank mix, and Previcur Flex. All of the aforementioned fungicides need to be tank mixed with a broad-spectrum fungicide such as mancozeb or chlorothalonil not just for resistance management but also because the potato plants will be attacked by other pathogens at the same time.

If adequate field scouting occurs and late blight is found soon after disease development, localized patches of potato plants can be killed with a desiccant (e.g. paraquat) through the use of a backpack sprayer. This management technique can be thought of as a field-scale hypersensitive response similar to what occurs in some plant-viral interactions whereby cells surrounding the initial point of infection are killed in order to prevent proliferation of the pathogen.

If infected tubers make it into a storage bin, there is a very high risk to the storage life of the entire bin. Once in storage, there isn't much that can be done besides emptying the parts of the bin that contain tubers infected with Phytophthora infestans. To increase the probability of successfully storing potatoes from a field where late blight was known to occur during the growing season, some products can be applied just prior to entering storage (e.g. Phostrol).

Around the world the disease causes around $6 billion of damage to crops each year.

Resistant plants

Breeding for resistance, particularly in potato plants, has had limited success in part due to difficulties in crossing cultivated potato to its wild relatives, which are the source of potential resistance genes. In addition, most resistance genes only work against a subset of P. infestans isolates, since effective plant disease resistance only results when the pathogen expresses a RXLR effector gene that matches the corresponding plant resistance (R) gene; effector-R gene interactions trigger a range of plant defenses, such as the production of compounds toxic to the pathogen.

Potato and tomato varieties vary in their susceptibility to blight. Most early varieties are very vulnerable; they should be planted early so that the crop matures before blight starts (usually in July in the Northern Hemisphere). Many old crop varieties, such as King Edward potato are also very susceptible but are grown because they are wanted commercially. Maincrop varieties which are very slow to develop blight include Cara, Stirling, Teena, Torridon, Remarka, and Romano. Some so-called resistant varieties can resist some strains of blight and not others, so their performance may vary depending on which are around. These crops have had polygenic resistance bred into them, and are known as "field resistant". New varieties such as Sarpo Mira and Sarpo Axona show great resistance to blight even in areas of heavy infestation. Defender is an American cultivar whose parentage includes Ranger Russet and Polish potatoes resistant to late blight. It is a long white-skinned cultivar with both foliar and tuber resistance to late blight. Defender was released in 2004.

Genetic engineering may also provide options for generating resistance cultivars. A resistance gene effective against most known strains of blight has been identified from a wild relative of the potato, Solanum bulbocastanum, and introduced by genetic engineering into cultivated varieties of potato. This is an example of cisgenic genetic engineering.

Melatonin in the plant/P. infestans co-environment reduces the stress tolerance of the parasite.

Reducing inoculum
Blight can be controlled by limiting the source of inoculum. Only good-quality seed potatoes and tomatoes obtained from certified suppliers should be planted. Often discarded potatoes from the previous season and self-sown tubers can act as sources of inoculum.

Compost, soil or potting medium can be heat-treated to kill oomycetes such as Phytophthora infestans.

Environmental conditions
There are several environmental conditions that are conducive to P. infestans. An example of such took place in the United States during the 2009 growing season. As colder than average for the season and with greater than average rainfall, there was a major infestation of tomato plants, specifically in the eastern states. By using weather forecasting systems, such as BLITECAST, if the following conditions occur as the canopy of the crop closes, then the use of fungicides is recommended to prevent an epidemic.
The Beaumont and Smith periods have traditionally been used by growers in the United Kingdom, with different criteria developed by growers in other regions. The Smith period has been the preferred system used in the UK since its introduction in the 1970s.

Based on these conditions and other factors, several tools have been developed to help growers manage the disease and plan fungicide applications. Often these are deployed as part of Decision support systems accessible through web sites or smart phones.

Several studies have attempted to develop systems for real-time detection via flow cytometry or microscopy of airborne sporangia collected in air samplers. Whilst these methods show potential to allow detection of sporangia in advance of occurrence of detectable disease symptoms on plants, and would thus be useful in enhancing existing Decision support systems, none have been commercially deployed to date.

Use of fungicides

Fungicides for the control of potato blight are normally only used in a preventative manner, optionally in conjunction with disease forecasting. In susceptible varieties, sometimes fungicide applications may be needed weekly. An early spray is most effective. The choice of fungicide can depend on the nature of local strains of P. infestans. Metalaxyl is a fungicide that was marketed for use against P. infestans, but suffered serious resistance issues when used on its own. In some regions of the world during the 1980s and 1990s, most strains of P. infestans became resistant to metalaxyl, but in subsequent years many populations shifted back to sensitivity. To reduce the occurrence of resistance, it is strongly advised to use single-target fungicides such as metalaxyl along with carbamate compounds. A combination of other compounds are recommended for managing metalaxyl-resistant strains. These include mandipropamid, chlorothalonil, fluazinam, triphenyltin, mancozeb, and others. In the United States, the Environmental Protection Agency has approved oxathiapiprolin for use against late blight. In African smallholder production fungicide application can be necessary up to once every three days.

In organic production

In the past, copper(II) sulfate solution (called 'bluestone') was used to combat potato blight. Copper pesticides remain in use on organic crops, both in the form of copper hydroxide and copper sulfate. Given the dangers of copper toxicity, other organic control options that have been shown to be effective include horticultural oils, phosphorous acids, and rhamnolipid biosurfactants, while sprays containing "beneficial" microbes such as Bacillus subtilis or compounds that encourage the plant to produce defensive chemicals (such as knotweed extract) have not performed as well.
During the crop year 2008, many of the certified organic potatoes produced in the United Kingdom and certified by the Soil Association as organic were sprayed with a copper pesticide to control potato blight. According to the Soil Association, the total copper that can be applied to organic land is /year.

Control of tuber blight
Ridging is often used to reduce tuber contamination by blight. This normally involves piling soil or mulch around the stems of the potato blight meaning the pathogen has farther to travel to get to the tuber. Another approach is to destroy the canopy around five weeks before harvest, using a contact herbicide or sulfuric acid to burn off the foliage. Eliminating infected foliage reduces the likelihood of tuber infection.

Historical impact

The effect of Phytophthora infestans in Ireland in 1845–52 was one of the factors which caused over one million to starve to death and forced another two million to emigrate from affected countries. Most commonly referenced is the Great Irish Famine, during the late 1840s, from which the Irish population has still not fully recouped. The first recorded instances of the disease were in the United States, in Philadelphia and New York City in early 1843. Winds then spread the spores, and in 1845 it was found from Illinois to Nova Scotia, and from Virginia to Ontario. It crossed the Atlantic Ocean with a shipment of seed potatoes for Belgian farmers in 1845. All of the potato-growing countries in Europe were affected, but the potato blight hit Ireland the hardest. Implicated in Ireland's fate was the island's disproportionate dependency on a single variety of potato, the Irish Lumper. The lack of genetic variability created a susceptible host population for the organism after the blight strains originating in Chiloé Archipelago replaced earlier potatoes of Peruvian origin in Europe.

During the First World War, all of the copper in Germany was used for shell casings and electric wire and therefore none was available for making copper sulfate to spray potatoes. A major late blight outbreak on potato in Germany therefore went untreated, and the resulting scarcity of potatoes led to the deaths of 700,000 German civilians from starvation.

Since 1941, Eastern Africa has been suffering potato production losses because of strains of P. infestans from Europe.

France, Canada, the United States, and the Soviet Union researched P. infestans as a biological weapon in the 1940s and 1950s. Potato blight was one of more than 17 agents that the United States researched as potential biological weapons before the nation suspended its biological weapons program. Whether a weapon based on the pathogen would be effective is questionable, due to the difficulties in delivering viable pathogen to an enemy's fields, and the role of uncontrollable environmental factors in spreading the disease.

Late blight (A2 type) has not yet been detected in Australia and strict biosecurity measures are in place. The disease has been seen in China, India and south-east Asian countries.

In light of the periodic epidemics of P. infestans ever since its first emergence, it may be regarded as a periodically emerging pathogen - or a periodically "re-emerging pathogen".

References

Further reading

External links
 USAblight A National Web Portal on Late Blight
 International Potato Center
 Online Phytophtora bibliography
 EuroBlight a potato blight network in Europe
 USDA-BARC Phytophthora infestans page
 Organic Alternatives for Late Blight Control in Potatoes, from ATTRA
 Google Map of Tomato Potato Blight Daily Risk across NE USA
 Species Profile – Late Blight (Phytophthora infestans), National Invasive Species Information Center, United States National Agricultural Library. Lists general information and resources for Late Blight.
 Continuing education lesson created by The American Phytopathological Society
 entry on Late Blight by PlantVillage

infestans
Water mould plant pathogens and diseases
Potato diseases
Biological weapons